Arhopala achelous is a species of butterfly belonging to the lycaenid family that was described by William Chapman Hewitson in 1862. It is found in Southeast Asia (Peninsular Malaya, Singapore and Borneo).

Subspecies
Arhopala achelous achelous
Arhopala achelous malu Corbet, 1946 (Mergui)

Gallery

References

External links
"Arhopala Boisduval, 1832" at Markku Savela's Lepidoptera and Some Other Life Forms. Retrieved June 6, 2017.

Arhopala
Butterflies described in 1862
Butterflies of Asia
Taxa named by William Chapman Hewitson